The Y-factor method is a widely used technique for measuring the gain and noise temperature of an amplifier. It is based on the Johnson–Nyquist noise of a resistor at two different, known temperatures.

 

Consider a microwave amplifier with a 50-ohm impedance with a 50-ohm resistor connected to the amplifier input. If the resistor is at a physical temperature TR, then the Johnson–Nyquist noise power coupled to the amplifier input is PJ = kBTRB, where kB is Boltzmann’s constant, and B is the bandwidth. The noise power at the output of the amplifier (i.e. the noise power coupled to an impedance-matched load that is connected to the amplifier output) is Pout = GkB(TR + Tamp)B, where G is the amplifier power gain, and Tamp is the amplifier noise temperature. In the Y-factor technique, Pout is measured for two different, known values of TR. Pout is then converted to an effective temperature Tout (in units of kelvin) by dividing by kB and the measurement bandwidth B. The two values of Tout are then plotted as a function of TR (also in units of kelvin), and a line is fit to these points (see figure). The slope of this line is equal to the amplifier power gain. The x intercept of the line is equal to the negative of the amplifier noise temperature −Tamp in kelvins. The amplifier noise temperature can also be determined from the y intercept, which is equal to Tamp multiplied by the gain.

References

Microwave technology
Radio technology
Electrical engineering
Electronic engineering